Mabel Shaw may refer to:
 Mabel A. Shaw, held the record of gambling on horse races at Hollywood Park race track in California
 Mabel Shaw (missionary), English missionary and educator